David Rockwell (born July 25, 1956) is an American architect and designer. He is the founder and president of Rockwell Group, a 250-person cross-disciplinary architecture and design practice based in New York City with satellite offices in Madrid and Los Angeles.

Early life and education
Rockwell grew up in a theater family. His mother, a vaudeville dancer and choreographer, often cast him in community repertory productions. When he was 12, David's family moved from Deal, New Jersey to Guadalajara, Mexico. Rockwell trained in architecture at Syracuse University and the Architectural Association in London.

Career
Rockwell founded Rockwell Group in 1984.

Rockwell currently serves as Chair Emeritus of the Design Industries Foundation Fighting AIDS (DIFFA) and as a board member of Citymeals-on-Wheels, and New York Restoration Project. Rockwell also conceived and developed Imagination Playground pro-bono, a play space designed to encourage children to work together to create their own worlds of play. After five years of research on children and play, the first site-specific location opened in collaboration with the New York City Department of Parks and Recreation at Burling Slip in Manhattan in 2010. Rockwell Group developed portable, scalable models that can transform smaller, unused areas into play spaces. Through the U.N.I.C.E.F. P.L.A.Y. Project, in partnership with Disney, the blocks have been distributed to more than 13,000 children in Bangladesh and Haiti.

Awards 
Rockwell's honors include the 2016 Tony Award for Best Scenic Design for the musical She Loves Me and six Tony Award nominations for Best Scenic Design, the AIA New York Chapter President's Award; the 2008 National Design Award by the Smithsonian's Cooper-Hewitt National Design Museum for outstanding achievement in Interior Design; the 2009 Pratt Legends Award; the Presidential Design Award for his renovation of the Grand Central Terminal; induction into the James Beard Foundation Who's Who of Food & Beverage in America and Interior Design magazine's Hall of Fame; inclusion in Architectural Digest's AD 100; and the 2016 Drama Desk Award for Outstanding Scenic Design of a Musical for She Loves Me and five Drama Desk Award nominations for Outstanding Scenic Design of a Musical. Rockwell Group was named by Fast Company in 2008, 2014 and 2015 as one of the most innovative design practices in their annual World's 50 Most Innovative Companies issue. Rockwell is a Fellow of the American Institute of Architects. World Winners Prix Versailles 2018

Select design projects

 Chefs Club by Food & Wine, New York
 Gordon Ramsay's Maze (London)
 Maialino, New York
 Nobu restaurants worldwide, including New York, Hong Kong, Las Vegas, Doha, Melbourne and Dubai
 Aloft hotels (Starwood Hotels & Resorts)
 Andaz Maui at Wailea, Hawaii
 The Cosmopolitan of Las Vegas
 Nobu Hotel Caesars Palace, Las Vegas
 Nobu Hotel Eden Roc Miami Beach
 W Hotels New York, Union Square, Vieques, Paris, Singapore, and Madrid
 Hall of Fragments, the entrance installation to the 2008 Venice Architecture Biennale
 Walt Disney Family Museum
 The Center for Civil and Human Rights, Atlanta
 Elinor Bunin-Munroe Film Center, Lincoln Center
 The Shed (Diller Scofidio + Renfro, Leader Architect, and Rockwell Group, Collaborating Architect)
 15 Hudson Yards in collaboration with Diller Scofidio + Renfro
 TED Theater, Vancouver
 Dolby Theatre, home of the Academy Awards ceremony (Los Angeles)
 The Marketplace at the JetBlue terminal at John F. Kennedy International Airport
 NeueHouse, New York, Los Angeles
 Shinola
 Imagination Playground
 Moxy Chelsea
 The New York EDITION
 Rockwell Unscripted for Knoll
 Union Square Cafe
 Sky (skyscraper)
 NEMA (Chicago)
 Hayes Theater
The Perelman, New York City (Restaurant and Lobby Interior Architect)
93rd Oscars, Production Design
Hopkins Student Center for Johns Hopkins University, Baltimore
Climate Change Arena, Seattle
DineOut NYC pro bono initiative

Set design 
 Hairspray
 The Rocky Horror Show
 Dirty Rotten Scoundrels
 All Shook Up
 Legally Blonde
 Team America: World Police (2004, film)
 The 81st Annual Academy Awards (2009)
 The 82nd Annual Academy Awards (2010)
 The Normal Heart
 Catch Me If You Can
 Harvey
 Kinky Boots
 Lucky Guy
 You Can't Take It with You
 Side Show
 On the Twentieth Century
 She Loves Me
 On Your Feet!
 Falsettos
 Lobby Hero
 Pretty Woman
 Tootsie

Books
 Pleasure: The Architecture and Design of Rockwell Group, Universe, a division of Rizzoli Books, 2002.
 David Rockwell with Bruce Mau, Spectacle, Phaidon Press, 2006. Examines the history and public fascination with larger-than-life man-made events.
 What If...?: The Architecture and Design of David Rockwell, Metropolis Books, 2014.
Drama by David Rockwell, Phaidon, May 2021

See also
 List of Syracuse University People
 InterContinental Hong Kong

References

External links

 Rockwell Group website
 Rockwell Group Facebook
 Rockwell Group Instagram
 

1956 births
Living people
20th-century American architects
American scenic designers
Artists from Chicago
Artists from Guadalajara, Jalisco
People from Guadalajara, Jalisco
People from Deal, New Jersey
Primetime Emmy Award winners
Syracuse University alumni
Tony Award winners
21st-century American architects